This is a list of flag bearers who have represented Saudi Arabia at the Olympics.

Flag bearers carry the national flag of their country at the opening ceremony of the Olympic Games.

See also
Saudi Arabia at the Olympics

References

Saudi Arabia at the Olympics
Saudi Arabia
Olympic flagbearers